Albert Rawson Robertshaw (birth registered October→December 1861 – 17 November 1920) was an English rugby union footballer who played in the 1880s. He played at representative level for England, and Yorkshire, and at club level for Bradford FC, as a three-quarter, e.g. wing, or centre. Prior to Tuesday 27 August 1895, Bradford FC was a rugby union club, it then became a rugby league club, and since 1907 it has been the association football (soccer) club Bradford Park Avenue.

Background
Robertshaw's birth was registered in Bradford, West Riding of Yorkshire, and he died aged 58 in Bradford, West Riding of Yorkshire.

Playing career

International honours
Robertshaw won caps for England while at Bradford FC in 1886 against Wales, Ireland, and Scotland, and in 1887 against Wales, and Scotland.

Change of Code
When Bradford FC converted from the rugby union code to the rugby league code on Tuesday 27 August 1895, Rawson Robertshaw would have been approximately 34. Consequently, he could have been both a rugby union and rugby league footballer for Bradford FC.

Genealogical information
Rawson Robertshaw was the brother of the Yorkshire, and Bradford FC rugby union footballers, Herbert Robertshaw, Jeremiah Robertshaw, and Percy Robertshaw. Rawson Robertshaw's marriage was registered during January–March 1901 in Leeds.

References

External links
Search for "Robertshaw" at rugbyleagueproject.org (RL)
Photograph "The Robertshaw brothers - Rawson, Percy and Herbert Robertshaw all played for Yorkshire as did their brother Jeremiah. - 01/01/1887" at rlhp.co.uk
Photograph "Bradford's Yorkshire Rugby Union Cup winning side - Bradford's only Yorkshire Cup winning side of the Rugby Union era. - 01/01/1884" at rlhp.co.uk
Photograph "Bradford (F.C.) c.1888 - This team contained six England internationals. - 01/01/1888" at rlhp.co.uk

1861 births
1920 deaths
Bradford F.C. players
England international rugby union players
English rugby union players
Rugby union players from Bradford
Rugby union three-quarters
Yorkshire County RFU players